"I'm Your Man" is a song by British pop duo Wham!, released in 1985 on Epic Records in the UK and most of the world, and Columbia Records in the US. It was written and produced by George Michael.

Background & Writing
I'm Your Man, according to George Michael, was "pretty different to anything [Wham has] ever done". According to Michael:

History
"I'm Your Man" became Wham!'s third number one on the UK Singles Chart, but did not feature on a studio album, and was essentially an isolated single which was only followed up by a re-issue of the previous year's Christmas hit, "Last Christmas". Already the signs were there that George, now bearded, was ready to move his career into an adult market. The song also reached number three on the US Billboard Hot 100, prevented from further chart movement by Rocky IV soundtrack single "Burning Heart" by Survivor and "That's What Friends Are For" by Dionne and Friends.

Within six months of "I'm Your Man", Wham! had announced their split. They had a fourth and final number one and released a farewell album, prior to a concert at Wembley Stadium, at which "I'm Your Man" was the last song Michael performed with partner Andrew Ridgeley.

An extended mix of the song was released on Wham!'s 1986 album Music from the Edge of Heaven (the U.S. version of their final album The Final).

In 1996, the song was re-recorded by Michael in a funkier style. It appeared, credited to Michael solo, as a B-side on the "Fastlove" CD single (also being interpolated into an extended mix of "Fastlove") and, credited to Wham!, on The Best of Wham!: If You Were There....

In 2012, comedian John Bishop mimed and danced to the song along with a "Mini Me" version of himself at the end of his tour DVD Rollercoaster.

Reception
Cash Box said that it "continues to show the group’s indebtedness to Motown grooves and girl group vocal arrangements." Billboard agreed that it has Motown influence and is "handled with affection and accuracy."

Music video

The official music video for the song was directed by Andy Morahan. The video is presented in black and white, set in the London club Marquee where Wham! are performing the song. An extended intro and outro has George and Andrew trying without success to sell tickets to passersby. George makes a phone call to his agent Simon Napier-Bell, complaining about having to sing at the Marquee. He is heard saying "Simon, don't cry" and finally hangs up on him with the words "we got a gig to play goodbye". During the video, film countdown numbers flash up at times, making the numbers 69 and 66. It also shows "SEX" in the countdown.

Track listing

 Also released as a picture disc (WTA 6716) and cassette (TA40 6716)
 "Do It Right" is the instrumental version of "I'm Your Man"

Charts

Weekly charts

Year-end charts

Certifications

Lisa Moorish version

In 1995, Lisa Moorish covered "I'm Your Man" for her album I've Gotta Have It All, the background vocals were sung by George Michael. Just like "Mr Friday Night", the cover was also a moderate success on the UK charts.

Charts

Shane Richie version

In 2003, actor and EastEnders star Shane Richie also covered the song as a fundraising single for the BBC charity Children in Need. Produced by Absolute, Richie's version of the song reached number two on the UK Singles Chart.

Track listings
UK CD single
 "I'm Your Man" – 3:37
 "I'm Your Man" (Shanghai Surprize's East End Pop Mix) – 6:37
 "I'm Your Man" (video) – 3:37
 "The Making of the Video" – 1:59

UK DVD single
 "I'm Your Man" (video)
 "I'm Your Man" (karaoke)
 "The Making of the Video"

Charts

Weekly charts

Year-end charts

Certifications

References

1985 songs
1985 singles
1995 singles
2003 debut singles
Bertelsmann Music Group singles
Black-and-white music videos
Columbia Records singles
Epic Records singles
Irish Singles Chart number-one singles
Music videos directed by Andy Morahan
Number-one singles in Denmark
Number-one singles in New Zealand
Song recordings produced by Absolute (production team)
Song recordings produced by George Michael
Songs written by George Michael
UK Singles Chart number-one singles
Wham! songs